RemoteView is the family name of a group of software programs designed by Textron Systems Geospatial Solutions to aid in analyzing satellite or aerial images of the Earth's surface for the purpose of collecting and disseminating geospatial intelligence. The National Geospatial-Intelligence Agency (NGA) was a user of RemoteView software.

Overview 
RemoteView is an electronic light table application, initially developed and released commercially by Sensor Systems in 1996. An electronic light table application makes it possible for imagery analysts to review satellite images on a computer instead of examining film or printed photographs. RemoteView was originally written only for the Unix operating system, but as the US Department of Defense transitioned to the Windows operating system, Sensor Systems released a Windows-based version. Overwatch acquired Sensor Systems and the RemoteView software in 2005. Textron Systems acquired Overwatch in 2006.

RemoteView's main function is an imagery and geospatial analysis tool. It can display imagery formats, elevation data sets, and vector data sets. Capabilities include image enhancements, photogrammetry, orthorectification, multispectral classification, pan sharpening, change detection, assisted search, location positioning, and 3D terrain visualization. These features allow an intelligence analyst to review large-scale imagery and generate annotated reports on any findings.

Extensions
Textron Systems Geospatial Solutions offers extensions that add specialized capabilities to RemoteView. These include:

 Virtual Mosaic – a tool for quickly joining more than four adjacent or overlapping images
 3D Pro – a module that expands visualization tools to allow creating 3D virtual worlds for simulating real world conditions and planning missions
 RVConnect –  a tool that enables automatic data sharing between RemoteView and Esri’s ArcMap software
 V-TRAC Basic –  a complementary video player that allows analysis of full motion video recorded by UAVs
 V-TRAC Pro –  expands the abilities of V-TRAC Basic to include mark-up and reporting tools
 GeoCatalog for Desktop – a complementary database that makes it easier to organize and retrieve geospatial data

See also
 Geomatics
 Imagery analysis
 Remote sensing
 Remote sensing application
 Satellite imagery

References

External links
 RemoteView Product Page

GIS software
Remote sensing software